The News Media Group was founded in 2008 and is solely owned by its creator and publisher, The Coin News Group S.L., was a small formed publishing company based in the Costa del Sol in southern Spain.

History and profile
The News was a weekly free newspaper printed in English distributed on the Costa del Sol from Málaga to Sotogrande and inland as far as Antequera to over 53 towns and villages. The News was also distributed in Gibraltar and the last edition was issue 273 published on 23 April 2014. It is now a monthly magazine, then named The News Monthly Review. The office in Coin is closed and the owner, now  works from home.

References

2008 establishments in Andalusia
2014 disestablishments in Andalusia
The News Media Group
Companies of Andalusia
Defunct newspapers published in Spain
English-language newspapers published in Europe
Free newspapers
Mass media companies established in 2008
Publications established in 2008
Publications disestablished in 2014
Spanish companies established in 2008